is a Sanriku Railway Company station located in Yamada, Iwate Prefecture, Japan.

Lines
Rikuchū-Yamada Station is served by the Rias Line, and was located 65.5 rail kilometers from the terminus of the line at Sakari Station. Formerly, it was served by the Yamada Line.

Station layout
Rikuchū-Yamada Station had two opposed side platforms connected to the station building by an underground passage.

Platforms

Adjacent stations

History
Rikuchū-Yamada Station opened on 17 November 1935. The station was absorbed into the JR East network upon the privatization of the Japan National Railways (JNR) on 1 April 1987.  The station was destroyed in the fire which followed the 11 March 2011 Tōhoku earthquake and tsunami. As of 2018, the station have been rebuilt along with the rest of the closed segment of the Yamada Line. It was transferred to the Sanriku Railway upon completion on 23 March 2019. This segment joined up with the Kita-Rias Line on one side and the Minami-Rias Line on the other, which together constitutes the entire Rias Line. Accordingly, this station became an intermediate station of Rias Line.

Surrounding area
 National Route 45
Yamada Town Hall
Yamada Post Office
Yamada Port

References

External links
 JR East Station information 

Railway stations in Iwate Prefecture
Rias Line
Railway stations in Japan opened in 1935
Yamada, Iwate